Johann Georg Moeresius (1598–1657) was a poet and rector in Danzig (Gdańsk), Poland. 

Moeresius, a friend of the poet Johannes Plavius, dedicated a series of poems to the singer Constantia Zierenberg, the daughter of Johann Zierenberg who was mayor of the town from 1630 to 1642.

Sources
 Katarzyna Grochowska, From Milan to Gdańsk: The Story of A Dedication
 Biographisches zu Plavius

Moeresius, Johann Georg
Moeresius, Johann Georg
Moeresius, Johann Georg
Polish poets